The National Royalist Movement ( or MNR, NKB) was a group within the Belgian Resistance in German-occupied Belgium during World War II. It was active chiefly in Brussels and Flanders and was the most politically right-wing of the major Belgian resistance groups.

Background
The MNR was founded in German-occupied Belgium soon after the Belgian defeat of May 1940 by former members of the far-right Catholic, authoritarian Rexist Party. As an organisation, it had a strongly nationalist stance and was led by Eugène Mertens de Wilmars, a former admirer of the fascist, Leon Degrelle. The MNR wanted Belgium to become an authoritarian dictatorship under the rule of King Leopold III. 

In July 1941, the German occupation authorities became suspicious of the MNR and it was forced into hiding. After the arrest of Mertens de Wilmars in May 1942, it became overtly anti-German and began to engage in resistance activities. The MNR produced underground newspapers (including the Dutch language newspaper Vrije Volk) and collected military intelligence. It also provided help to Jews hiding from German persecution, Allied pilots shot down in occupied Europe and Belgian workers avoiding labour service in Germany. 

In collaboration with the Secret Army and the Witte Brigade, the MNR participated in the capture of the Port of Antwerp shortly before the Allied liberation in September 1944. The operation prevented the Germans from destroying the installations and provided the Allies with access to their first intact deep-sea port.

160 members of the MNR were executed or died in Nazi camps. Around 100 were killed in action during the liberation of the Port of Antwerp in September 1944. A monument to five members of the group killed during the liberation of Brussels is visible next to the Royal Museums of Fine Arts.

References

Bibliography

 van de Vijver, Herman, van Doorslaer, Rudi and Verhoeyen, Etienne (1988). België in de Tweede Wereldoorlog. Deel 6: Het verzet 2. DNB/Uitgeverij Peckmans, Kapellen. . Pp. 91-94. 

Belgian resistance groups
Military units and formations established in 1940